The Windward Islands cricket team is a cricket team representing the member countries of the Windward Islands Cricket Board of Control. The team plays in the West Indies Professional Cricket League (including the NAGICO Regional Super50) under the franchise name Windward Islands Volcanoes.

It includes the islands that were known as the British Windward Islands except for Barbados and Trinidad and Tobago, who have their own teams. Thus, it includes Dominica (technically one of the Leeward Islands, but as it was part of the Windward Islands colony from 1940 until independence, its cricket federation remains a part of the Windward Islands), Grenada, Saint Lucia and Saint Vincent and the Grenadines.

The team plays in inter-regional cricket competitions in the Caribbean, such as the Regional Four Day Competition and the Regional Super50, and the best players may be selected for the West Indies cricket team, which plays international cricket. However, Grenada took part in the 1998 Commonwealth Games cricket competition separately. The list of prominent cricketers who have played for the Windward Islands includes Sunil Ambris, Cameron Cuffy, Casper Davis, Winston Davis, Delorn Johnson, Obed McCoy, Nixon McLean, Junior Murray, Darren Sammy, Shane Shillingford, Devon Smith, Wilf Slack and Kesrick Williams.

Team history
The Windward Islands team is the least successful of the six West Indian first class teams, having failed to win a first-class title and with four one-day titles in 37 attempts. They played their first first-class match in 1959–60 against the touring England side, losing by ten wickets, and until 1980–81 they mainly played as a part of the Combined Islands. However, from 1981–82 onwards they have played as a separate entity.

On a few occasions, all in the one-day Red Stripe Bowl competition, two teams have represented the Windwards. In the 2001–02, Northern Windward Islands and Southern Windward Islands competed, while in 2002–03, a team from Saint Vincent and Grenadines and a Rest of the Windward Islands side took part.

Squad

Notable players

Prominent cricketers who have represented the Windward Islands include:
 Mike Findlay
 Winston Davis
 Nixon McLean
 Cameron Cuffy
 Deighton Butler
 Rawl Lewis
 Junior Murray
 Devon Smith
 Andre Fletcher
 Daren Sammy
 Johnson Charles
 Lockhart Sebastien
 Irvine Shillingford
 Shane Shillingford
 Adam Sanford

Honours 

 Domestic one-day competition (4): 1988–89, 2000–01, 2012–13, 2017-18

Grounds 

The Windward Islands team has played at the following venues

 Arnos Vale Stadium in Kingstown, Saint Vincent, 29 out of 103)
 Tanteen Recreation Ground in Grenada (6 matches)
 Queen's Park in Grenada (25 matches),
 Mindoo Philip Park in Saint Lucia (21 matches),
 Windsor Park in Dominica (16 matches).
 Daren Sammy Cricket Ground in Gros Islet, Saint Lucia.

The Mindoo Philip Park has not seen any first-class cricket since 2001, and has been replaced by the Darren Sammy Cricket Ground in Gros Islet, which has hosted four matches in three years.

See also
 List of international cricketers from the Windward Islands
 List of Windward Islands first-class cricketers
 Dominica national cricket team
 Grenada national cricket team
 Saint Vincent and the Grenadines national cricket team
 Saint Lucia national cricket team

References

External links
 Cricinfo
 CricketArchive
 Official website 

West Indian first-class cricket teams
Cricket in Dominica
Cricket in Grenada
Cricket in Saint Lucia
Cricket in Saint Vincent and the Grenadines
Cricket in the Windward Islands
National cricket teams
Windward Islands